Alembic Pharmaceuticals Ltd. is an Indian multinational pharmaceutical company headquartered in Vadodara. It is involved in manufacture of pharmaceutical products, pharmaceutical substances and intermediates. It is also termed to be a market leader in macrolides segment of anti-infective drugs in India.

The company has its headquarters and corporate office situated in Vadodara, Gujarat, India, while its manufacturing facilities are located at Panelav, Karakhadi in Gujarat and Sikkim, India. Its Panelav plant houses active pharmaceutical ingredients (APIs) and formulation manufacturing, while its Sikkim plant is involved in manufacture of formulations for Indian and non-regulated export markets.

History
Alembic Pharmaceuticals Ltd. initially began as Alembic Chemical Works where it started manufacturing tincture and alcohol at its unit at Vadodara in 1907. The company eventually entered into manufacturing cough syrups, vitamins, tonics and sulphur drugs. Further, Alembic entered into production of penicillin in the 1960s. This dedicated Alembic plant for the manufacture of penicillin was inaugurated by Lal Bahadur Shastri in the year 1961, the then Prime Minister of India. Alembic soon also initiated bulk production of vitamin B12. In the antibiotic section, soon after initiation of penicillin manufacture, Alembic began the production of erythromycin in 1971 for first time in India. Alembic also incorporated and launched the 'Althrocin' brand of erythromycin. In the year, 1997, Althrocin became the top selling brand of erythromycin in India. 

In 2000, Alembic received ISO 14000 certification for its Vadodara facility. 

In 2010, Alembic Pharmaceutical Ltd. demerged from Alembic Ltd. subsequent to the allotment of 133,515,914 equity shares of ₹2 each to the shareholders of Alembic Ltd. This made the shareholding of Alembic Ltd. in Alembic Pharmaceutical to reduce from 100% to 29.18%. 

In 2011, the equity shares of Alembic Pharmaceuticals Ltd. were listed on the Bombay Stock Exchange and National Stock Exchange of India.

Products and services
Alembic manufactures and sells pharmaceutical and active pharmaceutical ingredients (APIs). It also offers international and domestic formulations, with branded and generic formulations being under its domestic formulations.

Research and development
Alembic has two research and development (R&D) centres which have been well supported by Alembic for its growth initiatives. The company has spent much of its capital on R&D, with majority of expenses on R&D for its markets in the US. For the FY2015-2016, Alembic Pharmaceuticals invested ₹346 crore in  R&D alone with 470 on-going projects.

Mergers and acquisitions
In 2007, Alembic acquired the entire non-oncology formulation business of Dabur Pharma Ltd. for ₹159 crore. This acquisition is termed to be one of the largest in the domestic pharma sectors during the year 2007.

In 2012, Alembic Pharmaceuticals and Breckenridge Pharmaceutical, Inc. announced Paragraph IV ANDA litigation with Pfizer on Desvenlafaxine (Pristiq™). Alembic also entered into a product development and licence agreement with AccuBreak Pharmaceuticals Inc. USA.

In 2013, in order to market its products in USA, Alembic Pharmaceuticals entered into an out-licensing agreement with Ranbaxy Pharmaceuticals Inc. (Ranbaxy).

In 2014, Alembic Pharmaceuticals through its wholly owned subsidiary – Alembic Global Holdings, got into joint ventures with Adwiya Mami SARL Algeria and expanded its market in Algeria.

In 2015, Alembic expanded its market in Switzerland through signing an exclusive agreement with Novartis.

Listing and shareholding
On 20 September 2011, the equity shares of Alembic Pharmaceuticals post its demerger from Alembic Ltd. got listed on the Bombay Stock Exchange where it is a constituent of BSE 500 index and on the National Stock Exchange of India where it is a constituent of Nifty 500 index.

Awards and recognitions
In 2016, Forbes included Alembic Pharmaceuticals in ‘India’s Super 50 Companies 2016’ list.

In 2015, Alembic Pharmaceuticals received Thomson Reuters Top 50 Indian Innovators Award.

See also
 List of pharmaceutical companies
 Active pharmaceutical ingredients
 Generic drug

References

External links 
 

Companies based in Vadodara
Pharmaceutical companies of India
Indian companies established in 1907
Indian brands
Companies listed on the National Stock Exchange of India
Companies listed on the Bombay Stock Exchange
Indian companies established in 2010